Schizopetalum is a genus of crested millipedes in the family Schizopetalidae. There is at least one described species in Schizopetalum, S. koelbeli.

References

Further reading

 
 
 
 

Callipodida
Millipede genera